Dallas Buyers Club is a 2013 American biographical drama film written by Craig Borten and Melisa Wallack, and directed by Jean-Marc Vallée. The film tells the story of Ron Woodroof (Matthew McConaughey), an AIDS patient diagnosed in the mid-1980s: a time when HIV/AIDS pathogenesis and treatments were poorly understood, and the disease subjected to stigmatization. As part of an ongoing experimental AIDS treatment movement, Woodroof smuggled unapproved pharmaceutical drugs into Texas to treat his symptoms—where he distributed them to fellow people with AIDS by establishing the "Dallas Buyers Club" while facing opposition from the Food and Drug Administration (FDA). Two fictional supporting characters, Dr. Eve Saks (Jennifer Garner), and Rayon (Jared Leto), were composite roles created from interviews with transgender AIDS patients, activists, and doctors. Presidential biographer and PEN-USA winner Bill Minutaglio wrote the first magazine profile of the Dallas Buyers Club in 1992. The article, which featured interviews with Woodroof and also recreated his dramatic international exploits, attracted widespread attention from filmmakers and journalists.

Screenwriter Borten interviewed Woodroof in 1992 and wrote the script, which he polished with writer Wallack in 2000, and then sold to producer Robbie Brenner. Several other actors, directors, and producers who were attached at various times to the development of the film left the project. Universal Pictures also tried to make the film, but did not. A couple of screenwriters wrote drafts that were rejected. In 2009, producer Brenner involved Matthew McConaughey, because of his Texas origins, the same as Woodroof's. Brenner selected the first draft, written by Borten and Wallack, for the film, and then Vallée was set to direct the film. Principal photography began in November 2012, in New Orleans, continuing for 25 days of filming, which also included shooting in Baton Rouge. Brenner and Rachel Winter co-produced the film. The official soundtrack album featured various artists, and was released digitally on October 29, 2013, by the Relativity Music Group.

Dallas Buyers Club premiered at the 2013 Toronto International Film Festival and was released theatrically in the United States on November 1, 2013, by Focus Features, entering wide release on November 22. The film grossed over $52 million worldwide against a budget of $5 million. The film received widespread critical acclaim, resulting in numerous accolades. Most praised the performances of McConaughey and Leto, who received the Academy Award for Best Actor and for Best Supporting Actor, respectively, at the 86th Academy Awards, making this the first film since Mystic River (2003), and only the fifth film ever, to win both awards. The film also won the award for Best Makeup and Hairstyling, and garnered nominations for Best Picture, Best Original Screenplay, and Best Editing.

Plot
Promiscuous Dallas electrician and rodeo cowboy Ron Woodroof is diagnosed with HIV/AIDS and given 30 days to live. At first, he refuses to accept the diagnosis until he remembers having unprotected sex with a prostitute who was an intravenous drug user. Woodruff's family and friends ostracize him, mistakenly assuming he contracted AIDS from gay sex (he is straight). He is fired from his job and evicted from his home. His doctor, Eve Saks, tells him an antiretroviral drug called zidovudine (AZT)—the only drug yet approved for testing in human clinical trials by the FDA—is thought to prolong the life of AIDS patients. Saks informs him that half of the trial patients receive the drug and the other half a placebo since this is the only way to determine if the drug works.

Woodroof bribes a hospital worker to get him AZT which, exacerbated by his cocaine use, causes his health to deteriorate. Recuperating in the hospital, he meets Rayon, a drug-addicted, HIV-positive trans woman to whom he is initially hostile. As his health worsens, he drives to a makeshift Mexican hospital to get more AZT. The facility is run by an American, Dr. Vass, whose medical license was revoked because his work with AIDS patients had violated US regulations. Vass warns Woodroof against AZT, telling him it is "poisonous." Instead, he prescribes a cocktail of drugs and nutritional supplements centered on ddC and the protein peptide T, which are not yet approved in the US. Three months later, Woodroof finds his health much improved and realizes he could make money by importing the drugs and selling them to other HIV-positive patients. He is able to get the drugs over the border by masquerading as a priest and claiming they are for personal use. Saks starts to notice the adverse effects of AZT, but her supervisor, Dr. Sevard, tells her the trials cannot be discontinued.

Woodroof starts selling the drugs in Dallas on the street, at gay nightclubs, and at discotheque bars. He reluctantly sets up a business with Rayon since she can bring in more customers. The pair establish the Dallas Buyers Club, charging $400 per month for membership. The club is extremely popular, and Woodroof gradually begins to respect Rayon as a friend. When Woodroof has a heart attack caused by an overdose of recently acquired interferon from Japan, Sevard learns of the club and its alternative drugs and is angry that they are interfering with his trial. The FDA confiscates the interferon and threatens to have Woodroof arrested. Saks agrees that there are benefits to clubs for HIV drugs but feels powerless to change anything. The process the FDA uses to research, test, and approve drugs is considered flawed and part of the problem for AIDS patients. At that time, the United States and its FDA were particularly conservative by international standards in testing and approving anti-AIDS drugs and hostile to imported drugs to the point they were made contraband. Saks and Woodroof begin a friendship.

The FDA gets a warrant to raid the buyers club but can do nothing but fine Woodroof. The FDA changes its regulations in 1987, making any unapproved drug illegal. With the club strapped for cash, Rayon begs her father for money and tells Woodroof that she has sold her life insurance policy to raise money. Woodroof travels to Mexico and gets more peptide T. Upon his return, Ron finds that Rayon has died in the hospital. Upset by Rayon's death, Saks is asked to resign when the hospital discovers she had been sending patients to the buyers club, but refuses, insisting that she will have to be fired instead.

Woodroof shows more compassion towards gay, lesbian, and transgender members of the club, and making money becomes less of a concern; his priority becomes providing the drugs. Peptide T gets increasingly challenging to acquire. Woodruff files a lawsuit against the FDA in late 1987, seeking the legal right to take the protein, which has been confirmed as non-toxic but is still not FDA-approved. The judge is sympathetic toward him and admonishes the FDA, but lacks the power to do anything. The FDA later allows Woodroof to take peptide T for personal use. He dies of AIDS in 1992, seven years later than his doctors initially predicted.

Cast

 Matthew McConaughey as Ron Woodroof, a real-life AIDS patient who smuggled unapproved pharmaceutical drugs into Texas when he found them effective at improving his symptoms. In an interview with CBS News' Lee Cowan in February 2014, McConaughey said that he selected the role because he thought it was not just a normal story, but it was a story of a "wild man". McConaughey was raised near Dallas, so he was very familiar with the culture. Additionally, he thought that the script was "incredibly human, with no sentimentality". McConaughey lost nearly 50 pounds (22 kilograms) to play Woodroof in the film.
 Jennifer Garner as Dr. Eve Saks, who treats AIDS patients like Woodroof and Rayon. Upon Garner's casting, after reading the script she expressed: "I had heard about it, and I had seen pictures of Matthew losing weight. And really couldn't imagine how I was going to do it, and was so happy at home."
 Jared Leto as Rayon, a fictional trans woman with HIV who helps Woodroof. To accurately portray his role, Leto lost 30 pounds (13 kilograms), shaved his eyebrows and waxed his entire body. He stated the portrayal was grounded in his meeting transgender people while researching the role. He stated that, when he moved to Los Angeles in 1991, he had a roommate who died of AIDS. He "[worked] on Rayon's voice for weeks" and refused to break character during filming; director Vallée stated: "I don't know Leto. Jared never showed me Jared."
 Denis O'Hare as Dr. Sevard
 Steve Zahn as Tucker, a cop
 Michael O'Neill as Richard Barkley, an FDA agent and antagonist
 Dallas Roberts as David Wayne, Ron's lawyer
 Griffin Dunne as Dr. Vass, a Mexico-based doctor
 Kevin Rankin as T. J., Ron's friend
 Bradford Cox as "Sunflower", Rayon's lover, a cross-dresser dying of AIDS
 Scott Takeda as Mr. Yamata
 Adam Dunn (cameo) as a bartender

Production

Development
The film is based on the real life of Ron Woodroof, a patient of HIV and AIDS, who was the subject of a lengthy 1992 article in The Dallas Morning News written by journalist and author Bill Minutaglio. A month before Woodroof died in September 1992, screenwriter Craig Borten was told about the story by his friend, so he went and interviewed him to create the screenplay; Borten recorded many hours of interviews with Woodroof and had access to his personal journals. Borten wrote a script for what he believed would make a great movie and attempted to attract interest in making the film in mid 1996, with Dennis Hopper attached to direct. Columbia Pictures was set to buy the script but the film was unable to secure financial backing.

In an interview, Borten revealed that he met Melisa Wallack in 2000 and asked her to help with the script, to which she said yes. In 2001, after one year of working on the script, they sold it to producer Robbie Brenner, who then set Marc Forster to direct the film for Universal Pictures, but left due to some personal delays. In June 2008, Craig Gillespie and Ryan Gosling were in talks to join the film, which was to be produced by David Bushell and Marc Abraham for Universal Pictures and Strike Entertainment. Chase Palmer was writing the script that time around, and screenwriters Guillermo Arriaga and Stephen Belber had reportedly also written the subsequent drafts for the film. In 2009, producer Robbie Brenner got involved again and rejected all the rewrites of the script, and the original version by Borten and Wallack was sent to actor Matthew McConaughey to see if the Dallas native would be interested in playing the role. On March 9, 2011, Jean-Marc Vallée was confirmed to direct the film based on the script by Borten and Wallack. Rachel Winter also attached to produce the film.

On November 14, 2012, it was announced that Remstar Films had acquired the Canadian rights while Entertainment One would handle the United Kingdom rights for the film. On April 23, 2013, Focus Features acquired the United States and Latin American distribution rights for the theatrical release of the film. In May 2013, Voltage Pictures and Truth Entertainment closed a deal to produce the film.

Casting

In 1996, Woody Harrelson was attached to the film to play Ron Woodroof, but left the film because of financing issues. In 2002, Brad Pitt was attached to play the lead role. In June 2008, Ryan Gosling was in talks to join the film for the lead role to play Woodroof, but couldn't take the role. In 2009, producer Brenner sent the script to actor Matthew McConaughey and got him involved to star in the film. Wondering whether the Texas native was interested in playing another Texas native (he's originally from Uvalde), Brenner says that he asked himself: Who is Ron Woodroof?' And in my mind, it was Matthew. Like Ron, he's from Dallas, he's handsome, and he has a twinkle in the eye. Matthew also has intensity and intelligence like Ron did, mixed with that cowboy charisma and fighter's spirit. He was beyond perfect for the role." Writer Borten said: "Ron was a very charismatic, funny and persuasive, a real salesman. Even if he was making fun of you, you wanted him to continue because he was so charming. Matthew possesses a lot of those same qualities." On March 9, 2011, Los Angeles Times confirmed that McConaughey would star in the film as Woodroof and quoted McConaughey as saying: "It's a great script and a great story. And I think it can be a great movie."

On May 11, 2011, Hilary Swank was reportedly in talks to join the film with McConaughey's role confirmed. On October 3, 2012, it was announced that Swank had dropped out of the film and that Gael García Bernal was in talks to play an HIV patient who meets Woodroof in the hospital and helps him in the club. On November 6, The Hollywood Reporter confirmed that Jared Leto would be returning to acting to play the role which Bernal was previously in talks to play. In January 2014, Jared Leto admitted that he was sent a script 15 years ago but never read it. When Leto was asked about his role, he said: "This was a really special movie. I think it was the role of a lifetime. It's one of the best things I've ever done." He also said that he tried to stay focused on the role because he knew it was an incredible opportunity. On November 14, Dallas Roberts and Steve Zahn joined the film; Roberts would play David Wayne, Ron's defense attorney, while Zahn would play a Dallas police officer who is sympathetic to Ron. On November 26, Griffin Dunne, Denis O'Hare, and Bradford Cox joined the cast when the shooting was underway in New Orleans.

Filming
Principal photography began on November 11, 2012 in New Orleans. Filming also took place in Baton Rouge. Jennifer Garner has stated that the film was shot very quickly over just 25 days and has remarked that McConaughey "gave an even wilder performance in takes that didn't appear onscreen". McConaughey stated that "I was riding a new way of making a film. There were no lights, one camera, 15-minute takes." Half of the shots were lit with artificial light and the other half were not. Vallée said: "I now had a perfect opportunity to try to shoot an entire movie without artificial lights, using the Alexa digital camera. Like the RED, the Alexa offers a broad spectrum of colors and shadows in even the darkest natural lighting conditions. I felt that the approach was right for this project. The look and feel became that we were capturing reality; even though Dallas Buyers Club is not a documentary in content or structure, it could have that subtle quality. We shot the movie 100% handheld with two lenses, a 35-millimeter and a 50-millimeter. These get close to the actors and don't skew the images. (Director of Photography) Yves Belanger adjusted for every shot at 400 or 1600 ASA (light sensitivity), displaying different color balance."

Jared Leto, who played Rayon, an AIDS patient and trans woman with a drug problem, refused to break character for the whole 25 days of shooting. In interviews of people who were involved in the film said about Leto that, in a sense, they never really met Leto until months after the shoot was over. Leto said about his character, "That phrase staying in character to me really means commitment, focus, and for a role like this that's so intense and challenging and extreme in a lot of ways, it demanded my full attention."

Music

The film does not feature an original score, but several original and incorporated songs, released as a separate album. The album Dallas Buyers Club (Music from and Inspired by the Motion Picture) was released on October 30, 2013, by the Relativity Music Group. The soundtrack album featured various artists, include Leto's band Thirty Seconds to Mars, Tegan and Sara, Awolnation, The Naked and Famous, T. Rex, My Morning Jacket, Fitz and the Tantrums, Blondfire, Neon Trees, Cold War Kids, Capital Cities, The Airborne Toxic Event, and more. It was announced that 40 cents of every sale of album at iTunes would go to the AIDS relief charity Project Red's Global Fund.

Release
The first trailer was launched on August 27, 2013. The film premiered at the 2013 Toronto International Film Festival on September 7, on which Deadline's Pete Hammond said, "It would seem an absolute no-brainer that both (McConaughey and Leto) will be sitting front and center come March 2nd at the Dolby Theatre when Oscar winners are announced. If there are two better performances by anyone this year I have not seen them." Focus Features released the film on November 1, 2013.

Box office
The film's release was previously set for December 5, but hoping to gain a competitive edge amid a crowded playing field, Focus Features shifted the release date to November 1, believing the new date was ideal to launch a platform release in the awards season, and expecting to do a wide release for 5-day Thanksgiving weekend (November 27 – December 1). Because the film was an awards contender, Focus set the date in November for an Oscars strategy like that for 2013 Oscar winner Argo, which was released in October 2012.

Over its opening weekend from November 1–3 of limited release in Los Angeles, New York, Toronto and Montreal, the film grossed $260,865 from 9 theaters with an average of $28,985 per theater, In second weekend from November 8–10, film grossed $638,704, making total of $993,088 with an average amount of $18,249 from 35 theaters. And it was expanded to 184 locations in its third week of release and it grossed $1,751,359 from Nov 15–17, with an average of $9,518, making total of $3,012,295. It opened wide on November 22 (the weekend before Thanksgiving) in 666 theaters and grossed $2,687,157 from November 22–24, with a total of $6,374,058 and average of $4,035 per location. The wide release coincided with the Screen Actors Guild Awards ballots deadline, and was before the Golden Globe Awards ballots. The Screen Actors Guild mailed Screen Actors Guild Award nomination ballots to its voters on November 20, and the nomination ballots for the Golden Globe Awards were mailed to the Hollywood Foreign Press Association members on or before November 27.

71st Golden Globe Awards were announced on January 12, 2014 with Dallas Buyers Club winning both of its nominations, and the film earned six 86th Academy Awards nominations that were announced on January 16. The twelfth weekend after limited release, the film's theater run jumped from 125 screens to a total of 419 and the film grossed $17,813,220 with an average of $2,246 per theater from January 17–19. After the 20th Screen Actors Guild Awards were announced on January 18 with Dallas Buyers Club winning two of its three nominations, during the thirteenth weekend from January 24–26, 2014, the film expanded to 1,110 locations (highest playing of the film) and grossed $2,028,570 more in that weekend with an average of $1,828. Until that weekend the top grossing markets were Los Angeles, New York, San Francisco, Chicago and Dallas.
                                                                    
After a total of 182 days, the film ended its American theatrical run on May 1, 2014 with a gross of $27,298,285 in North America. It grossed $27,900,000 in foreign countries including $8,755,794 of the United Kingdom, $2,761,258 of Australia, making a worldwide total gross of $55,198,285.

Home media
Dallas Buyers Club was released on DVD and Blu-ray on February 4, 2014. In the United States, the film has grossed $4,532,240 from DVD sales and $3,097,179 from Blu-ray sales, making a total of $7,629,419.

Reception

Critical response
Upon its premiere at the 2013 Toronto International Film Festival, Dallas Buyers Club received universal acclaim by critics and audiences, who greatly praised the film for its acting (particularly for McConaughey and Leto), screenplay and direction. Review aggregation website Rotten Tomatoes gives the film a score of 92% based on 266 reviews, with an average rating of 7.80/10. The site's consensus reads, "Dallas Buyers Club rests squarely on Matthew McConaughey's scrawny shoulders, and he carries the burden gracefully with what might be a career-best performance." Metacritic gives the film a score of 78 out of 100, based on 47 critics, indicating "generally favorable reviews".

Richard Corliss of Time magazine considered McConaughey's portrayal to be a "bold, drastic and utterly persuasive inhabiting of a doomed fighter", remarking that "if the camera occasionally suffers a fashionable case of the jitters, the movie transcends its agitated verismo to impart dramatic and behavioral truth". Chris Bumbray reviewed the film for JoBlo.com and gave it 9 out of 10, and said, "Like Woodroof, the film never wants your pity, and while tears will no doubt be shed while watching it, they're well-earned." The Philadelphia Inquirers Steven Rea talked about McConaughey's role, "Just about everything is right with Dallas Buyers Club, beginning with Matthew McConaughey's literally transformative portrayal. McConaughey's performance isn't just about the weight loss. It's about gaining compassion, even wisdom, and it's awesome." Mick LaSalle of the San Francisco Chronicle said, "Dallas Buyers Club" takes audiences back to the worst of the AIDS crisis, where the disease was a death sentence, and the public's terror and hostility were at its height." Film critic Richard Roeper reviewed the film for his own website, and talked about McConaughey: "Once we get past McConaughey's stunning transformation, we're transfixed by a performance that reminds us of why this guy became a movie star in the first place." Ann Hornaday gave the film 4 out of 4 ratings, and then gave her remarks on McConaughey's remarkable performance for The Washington Post, "McConaughey delivers the performance of his career, characterized not just by an astonishing physical transformation but by a wellspring of deep compassion and fearlessness."

The Orange County Registers film critic Michael Sragow gave the film grade "A" and commented on three lead characters, "A trio of terrific performers imbues a riveting AIDS drama with heart and mind as well as pertinence." Film critic Ty Burr reviewed the film for The Boston Globe and criticized, "The movie's often touching and very watchable, but what gets you past the script's sincere calculation is the growing sense of rage toward a medical–industrial complex that saw AIDS sufferers as guinea pigs and sources of profit." The Chicago Tribunes film critic Michael Phillips talked about "How Woodroof became his own brand of AIDS activist is the stuff of Dallas Buyers Club, which does a few things wrong but a lot right, starting right at the top with McConaughey." Bob Mondello criticized the film's character for NPR in these words: "Dallas Buyers Club is just about a selfish boor who arguably gets a pass in terms of posterity, because while looking out for No. 1, he paved the way for change for everyone else." Dana Stevens of Slate magazine praised McConaughey's performance, highlighting that the movie "traffics in deep hindbrain emotions: fear and rage and lust and, above all, the pure animal drive to go on living."

Lou Lumenick of the New York Post expressed his compliments about the film's crew, "It's a remarkable story, vividly and urgently told by French-Canadian director Vallée from a pointed, schmaltz-free script by Craig Borten and Melissa Wallack." A. O. Scott reviewed the film for The New York Times and said, "Matthew McConaughey brings a jolt of unpredictable energy to Dallas Buyers Club, an affecting if conventional real-life story of medical activism." The Wall Street Journals film critic thinks "Matthew McConaughey continues to amaze." David Denby of The New Yorker talked about McConaughey's physical transformation in his words, "It's McConaughey's spiritual transformation that is most remarkable. His gaze is at once desperate and challenging." Rolling Stone's Peter Travers said, "[Matthew McConaughey's] explosive, unerring portrayal defines what makes an actor great, blazing commitment to a character and the range to make every nuance felt." Film critic Rex Reed reviewed the film for The New York Observer and said, "Dallas Buyers Club represents the best of what independent film on a limited budget can achieve-powerful, enlightening and not to be missed." The Wraps Alonso Duralde said why he watched the film, "McConaughey is the only reason to see Dallas Buyers Club, but he's enough of a reason to see Dallas Buyers Club."

Film critic Betsy Sharkey reviewed for the Los Angeles Times, "[McConaughey and Leto] elevate the movie beyond ordinary biography or overplayed tragedy, and give Oscar-worthy performances in the process." Sharkey expressed her compliments about Leto's performance, "Leto's performance, though, is the revelation. ... It's a hauntingly authentic performance; the tailored suit he puts on to meet with his disapproving father is one of the film's most moving scenes." Peter Debruge of Variety said, "Matthew McConaughey and Jared Leto give terrific performances in this riveting and surprisingly relatable true story."

Leto's portrayal of Rayon, a drug-addicted trans woman with AIDS who befriends McConaughey's character Ron Woodroof, received critical acclaim. The writers created Rayon, to show "Woodroof's gradual acceptance of a subculture he had dismissed." Times Richard Corliss noted, "Leto captures the sweet intensity and almost saintly good humor of a glamorous, poignant and downright divoon creature — a blithe Camille who may surrender her health but never her panache." Leto was awarded an Academy Award, Golden Globe, a Screen Actors Guild Award, and a variety of film critics' circle awards. After the 86th Academy Awards ceremony, the casting of a non-transgender actor was critiqued as a missed opportunity, with some LGBT activists criticizing the choice as transmisogynistic. A guest blogger published on the L.A. Times website compared the issue to white actors appropriating, and exploiting, the roles of East Asians and Africans in the past; and guest contributors noted in The Guardian and The Independent that transgender actors are often relegated to roles such as prostitutes, corpses and "freaks."

Accolades

Dallas Buyers Club received six nominations at the 86th Academy Awards: Best Picture, Best Actor for McConaughey, Best Supporting Actor for Leto, Best Original Screenplay, Best Film Editing for Martin Pensa and Vallée (Vallée being credited under the pseudonym "John Mac McMurphy"), and Best Makeup and Hairstyling for Adruitha Lee and Robin Mathews. McConaughey and Leto won Academy Awards for Best Actor and Best Supporting Actor, respectively – the first film since Mystic River 10 years earlier to receive both awards and only the fifth overall to do so. Lee and Mathews won the Best Makeup and Hairstyling, although Mathews had a budget of only $250.

The film received two Screen Actors Guild Awards, for Best Actor (McConaughey) and Best Supporting Actor (Leto); it was also nominated for Best Cast. At the 71st Golden Globe Awards McConaughey and Leto again won Best Actor – Motion Picture – Drama and Best Supporting Actor – Motion Picture respectively. The film was also nominated for Best Original Screenplay at the Writers Guild of America Awards, while Leto's performance won a range of awards from critics groups, including the New York Film Critics Circle and the Los Angeles Film Critics Association. The National Board of Review named Dallas Buyers Club one of the top ten independent films of 2013.

Historical accuracy

The characters of Rayon and Dr. Eve Saks were fictional; the writers had interviewed transgender AIDS patients, activists, and doctors for the film and combined these stories to create the two composite supporting roles. However, Woodroof did lose all his friends after they found out he was HIV-positive. In his interviews with Borten, Woodroof implied that this, along with interactions with gay people living with AIDS through the buyers club, led to a rethinking of his apparent anti-gay sentiments and changed his views on gay people. Other people who knew him said that he did not harbor anti-gay sentiments and was himself bisexual. Also, while a rodeo enthusiast, he never rode any bulls himself. Although the film shows Woodroof diagnosed in 1985, he told Borten that a doctor had informed him he might have had the disease well before that; Woodroof believed that he may have been infected in 1981, something that was briefly alluded to in a flashback in the film.

While Woodroof was known for outlandish behavior, according to those who knew him, both the film and McConaughey made him rougher than he actually was; The Dallas Morning News has reported that Woodroof was "outrageous, but not confrontational" and that people who knew him felt that his portrayal as "rampantly homophobic" early in the film was inaccurate. The real Woodroof also had a sister and a daughter who were not approached by the writers and were left out of the script to make the film more of a character study.

The visual blog Information is Beautiful deduced that, while taking creative license into account, the film was 61.4% accurate when compared to real-life events, summarizing that the film seemed "like an authentically true-story with liberties taken".

Drug treatments
The film implies that the drug and vitamin regimen promoted by Woodroof was safer and more effective than the drugs being issued in hospitals and tested by the FDA at the time, but this has been criticized by numerous observers. Daniel D'Addario, in an article in Salon, suggests that "the film's take is perilously close to endorsing pseudoscience."

Woodroof frequently declares that the drug AZT (azidothymidine) is ineffective and counter-productive, yet years later it is still prescribed to patients with AIDS, albeit at a much lower dose (as mentioned in the epilogue). Medical historian Jonathan Engel, who wrote The Epidemic: A History of AIDS, states that AZT was in fact a relatively effective treatment for the period, consistently prolonging lives for a year at a time when AIDS had a 100% mortality rate.  Journalist David France, who directed the documentary How to Survive a Plague, suggested that AZT was actually "the first element of a cocktail of drugs that ended the era of AIDS-as-death sentence". Initial attempts to use high doses of AZT proved to be no more effective than smaller doses, but HIV/AIDS activist Peter Staley (who was consulted by the filmmakers) believes this was not the result of any conspiracy – initially medical researchers had to guess what dose would be effective and they feared a low dose would be ineffective. Eventually, researchers realized that AZT was ineffective in the long term because the HIV virus mutated and became resistant to the treatment. By the mid-1990s, David Ho and other researchers found AZT was quite effective when used in conjunction with two other anti-virals, which decreased the chances of virus developing resistance to any one drug.

The treatments that Woodroof did promote were less-effective at best, or at worst, dangerous. According to Staley, Woodroof became a proponent of Peptide T, a treatment which "never panned out. It's a useless therapy, and it never got approved, and nobody uses it today, but the film implies that it helped him." DDC, also promoted by Woodroof, did prove to be an effective antiviral treatment, but it also proved to have worse side effects than AZT, with the potential to cause irreversible nerve damage in some cases. As a result, it was only used by doctors for a relatively short time. A third treatment promoted by Woodroof, called Compound Q (Trichosanthin), was specifically linked to two deaths during trials, and therefore, was not used by doctors thereafter. Most "buyers clubs" stopped providing it as well, but Woodroof continued to dispense it, part of the reason for Woodroof's conflict with the FDA.

Copyright enforcement by the film's makers

Canada
Canadian law firm Aird & Berlis filed a court case on behalf of their client Dallas Buyers Club LLC against 17 "John Doe" defendants for alleged piracy of their movie.

Australia
Makers of Dallas Buyers Club have attempted to aggressively enforce their copyrights by serving discovery orders on Australian internet service providers (ISPs). iiNet, one of the ISPs served with a discovery application, stated it has "serious concerns" that the film's makers will look to intimidate subscribers. Steve Dalby, iiNet's chief regulatory officer, said: "We are concerned that our customers will be unfairly targeted to settle claims out of court using a practice called 'speculative invoicing. Information of up to 4,700 subscribers were being sought for allegedly downloading the film before its box office release.

In April 2015, an Australian federal judge, Justice Nye Perram ruled that ISPs must hand over contact information related to the IP addresses associated with sharing the movie.

In August 2015 the Australian Federal Court refused the application for film makers of Dallas Buyers Club to force ISPs to hand over the details of their customers. The courts found that the contents of the letter, proposed by the film makers to contact downloaders with, were more demanding than deemed appropriate. The letter was found to ask for such details as salary and other films that were downloaded, as well as punitive damages, which are illegal to seek under Australian law.

In December 2015, Justice Perram dismissed the Dallas Buyers Club LLC case against iiNet entirely unless an appeal were filed by February 11, 2016. The judge remarked upon DBC's attempts to claim costs for a worldwide non-exclusive distribution agreement, concluding that "DBC's contention was wholly unrealistic; indeed, I went so far as to describe it as 'surreal. Perram also required posting a $600,000 bond to the court should the suit proceed.

Singapore
Dallas Buyer Club LLC successfully obtained a court order against two major ISPs Starhub and M1 to reveal customers who have allegedly downloaded illegal copies of the movie. In April 2015, Samuel Seow Law Corporation represented the owners in sending demand letters to more than 500 subscribers asking for a written offer of damages and costs. A few days later, Singtel was also issued a court order to reveal 150 of its subscribers for alleged illegal downloading. President Harish Pillay and Vice-President Professor Ang Peng Hwa of the Singapore Internet Society (ISOC) Chapter stated, that "threatening subscribers won't stop piracy". This is the second reported instance of a major legal action taken by a media company against individuals in Singapore for alleged illegal downloading since Odex's actions against file-sharing in 2007.

United States
Beginning in 2014, Voltage Pictures filed nearly 150 multi-defendant "John Doe" lawsuits against internet users identified only by their IP addresses, alleging illegal downloading of the film.  Despite statutory damages claims of $150,000, users reported settling claims with the film maker for $5,000 to $8,000.

References

External links

 
 
 
 
 
 
 

2013 biographical drama films
2013 independent films
2013 films
American biographical drama films
American independent films
American LGBT-related films
Films about gender
Cross-dressing in American films
Entertainment One films
Films directed by Jean-Marc Vallée
Films set in Mexico
Drama films based on actual events
Films based on newspaper and magazine articles
Films featuring a Best Actor Academy Award-winning performance
Films featuring a Best Supporting Actor Academy Award-winning performance
Films featuring a Best Drama Actor Golden Globe winning performance
Films featuring a Best Supporting Actor Golden Globe winning performance
Films set in Dallas
Films set in the 1980s
Films set in the 1990s
Films shot in New Orleans
Films that won the Academy Award for Best Makeup
Focus Features films
HIV/AIDS in American films
LGBT-related drama films
LGBT-related films based on actual events
Films about trans women
Voltage Pictures films
2013 LGBT-related films
2013 drama films
Films about anti-LGBT sentiment
Film controversies
Film controversies in the United States
Advertising and marketing controversies in film
LGBT-related controversies in film
Casting controversies in film
2010s English-language films
2010s American films
Films about disability